Beckton Sewage Treatment Works, formerly known as Barking Sewage Works, is a large sewage treatment plant in Beckton in the east London Borough of Newham, operated by Thames Water.

Since construction first began in 1864, the plant has been extended numerous times and now covers over 100 hectares (250 acres) - the largest sewage treatment works in Europe. It treats waste water arriving from the Northern Outfall Sewer and the Lee Tunnel, serving a large portion of London north of the River Thames.

The treated effluent from the plant is discharged into the Thames at the south-east corner of the site, adjacent to Barking Creek.

History 
Sewage treatment works were first established at Beckton in 1864 as part of Joseph Bazalgette's scheme to remove sewage (and hence reduce disease) from London by creating two large sewers from the capital, one on each side of the Thames and known as the Southern and Northern Outfall Sewers. In addition to the sewage from the Northern Outfall sewer the Becton treatment works also received sewage from a pumping station at North Woolwich. 

As originally conceived in 1864, the works comprised reservoirs covering 3.8 hectares designed to retain six hours’ flow of sewage. No sewage treatment was provided and the sewage was discharged on the ebb tide. The presence of raw sewage contributed to the high death toll in the 1878 Princess Alice disaster, when over 600 died in Britain's worst inshore shipping tragedy. Following the disaster a Royal Commission was appointed in 1882 to examine Metropolitan Sewage Disposal. It recommended that a precipitation process should be deployed to separate solids from liquid and that the solids should be burned, applied to land or dumped at sea. A precipitation works using lime and iron sulphate was installed at Beckton in 1887–89. Sludge was disposed of in the Barrow Deep and later in the Black Deep in the outer Thames estuary. In the year 1912/3 1,704,000 tons of sludge was sent to sea, by 1919/20 1.223 million tons of sludge were sent to sea, entailing 1,223 sludge vessel voyages.

In the year 1912/13 the total volume of sewage received at Beckton was 59,067 million gallons (268 million m3). In the year 1919/20 the volume was 59,667 million gallons (271 million m3). The costs of treating the sewage at Beckton was £73,698 or £1 4s 11d per million gallons (£1.246 per 4546.1 m3) in 1912/13; by 1919/20 the cost had increased to £79,074 or £1 6s 6d. (£1.325) per million gallons.

Advanced treatment 
In 1932–5 an activated sludge plant was installed which relied on surface aeration of the sewage by mechanical paddles. In 1959 a £7.5 million extension was completed. This comprised detritus removal, a screen house, primary sedimentation tanks, a diffused air activated sludge plant and sludge digestion. The works were extended in 1967 to treat 1.14 million cubic metres per day of sewage, although they were capable of accepting a flow of 2.6 million cubic metres per day. These works cost £21 million.

The Beckton plant comprised:

Sewage sludge was disposed of by dumping at sea in the outer Thames estuary until this practice was banned in 1998. In that year a sludge incineration plant was commissioned, which provides 11.4 MW of power for use at the treatment works.

New processes 
In 2014 an upgrade to the Beckton works included a new activated sludge process stream designed to treat 30 percent of the 27 cubic metres per second maximum flow to the works; three new odour control plants installed across the existing works to address planning conditions imposed on the upgrade project; replacement of 48 existing final settlement tank scrapers; and upgrades to a further 24 final settlement tanks.

Thames Tideway Scheme 

Wastewater collected by the Thames Tideway Scheme will be transferred to Beckton for treatment, via the Lee Tunnel from Abbey Mills Pumping Station.

In 2020, a new three-year, £123 million upgrade project was started to increase capacity at Beckton to allow it to process the increased flow of sewage. This included building a completely new inlet works, and extending aeration lanes and settlement tanks.

Desalination Plant 

The Beckton site was proposed in 2005 as the location for a desalination plant, but the proposal was rejected by Mayor Ken Livingstone as environmentally unacceptable. The scheme was resurrected by the successive mayor, Boris Johnson, as part of a deal with Thames Water to reduce delays in fixing roadworks throughout London.. 
Construction commenced in 2008 and the desalination plant was completed in June 2010.

The desalination plant collects brackish water from the river Thames while the tide is flowing out, treating it through a four-stage reverse osmosis process before re-adding minerals and sending it on to the freshwater distribution system. The plant can produce approximately 150 million litres of water per day - enough to supply 400,000 houses in North London.

See also 
 London sewer system
 Northern Outfall Sewer
 Lee Tunnel
 Abbey Mills Pumping Station
 Crossness Sewage Treatment Works

References 

Thames Water
London water infrastructure
Sewage treatment plants in the United Kingdom